The , mainly known as the ICE Cross Infinity Championship is a women's professional wrestling world championship created and promoted by the Ice Ribbon promotion.

History 

The championship, which is situated at the top of Ice Ribbon's championship hierarchy, was introduced as the ICE×60 Championship on December 23, 2008, when Seina defeated Makoto in the finals of a tournament to become the inaugural champion. Seina was the first champion in the title's history. Tsukasa Fujimoto holds the record for most reigns, with seven. Fujimoto also holds the record for the longest reign in the title's history at 615 days, achieved on her fourth reign. Maki Narumiya holds the record for the shortest reign with her only reign lasting 12 days.

To reflect the change, the title was renamed the ICE×∞ (ICE Cross Infinity) Championship on August 12, 2013. Time limits for championship matches were also raised from the original 20 minutes to 30 minutes; in the event of a time limit draw, the title is vacated.

Like most professional wrestling championships, the title is won as a result of a scripted match. There have been a total of thirty-five reigns shared among twenty-one different wrestlers. The current champion is Satsuki Totoro who is in her first reign.

Vacant title tournament (2022)
Tsukushi Haruka vacated the title on May 4, 2022 prior of her retirement from professional wrestling. A tournament to crown a new champion took place between May 28 and June 26, 2022.

Title history

Combined reigns 

See also
 Triangle Ribbon Championship
 International Ribbon Tag Team Championship

References

External links 
 Title history at IceRibbon.com
 ICE Cross Infinity Championship in English

Ice Ribbon championships
Women's professional wrestling championships